The  was an army of the Imperial Japanese Army during World War II.

History
The Japanese 31st Army was formed on February 18, 1944 under the Imperial General Headquarters as a garrison force to contest landings by Allied forces in the Japanese South Seas Mandate island-by-island, and to inflict such losses in a war of attrition that it would deter an American invasion of the Japanese home islands. The South Seas Mandate was divided into three sections (Northern Mariana Islands, southern Mariana Islands, and Truk). The 80,000 man Japanese 31st Army was initially headquartered on Truk.

After Operation Hailstone, the Japanese garrison on Truk was isolated as American forces continued their advance towards Japan by invading other Pacific islands.  Cut off, the Japanese forces on Truk and other central Pacific islands ran low on food and faced starvation before Japan surrendered in August 1945. (Stewart, 1986)

The garrisons in the Marianas were largely annihilated at the Battle of Saipan and Battle of Guam.

Structure
Thirty-First Army
Southern Marianas Force
29th Infantry Division
48th Independent Infantry Brigade
Northern Marianas Force
43rd Infantry Division
47th Independent Infantry Brigade
Truk Garrison Force
52nd Infantry Division
50th Independent Infantry Brigade
51st Independent Infantry Brigade
52nd Independent Infantry Brigade

List of commanders

Commanding officer

Chief of Staff

References

External links

31
Military units and formations established in 1944
Military units and formations disestablished in 1945